The Gila woodpecker (Melanerpes uropygialis) is a medium-sized woodpecker of the desert regions of the southwestern United States and western Mexico. In the U.S., they range through southeastern California, southern Nevada, Arizona, and New Mexico.

Description 

The back and wings of this bird are spotted and barred with a black and white zebra-like pattern. The neck, throat, belly and head are greyish-tan in color. The male has a small red cap on the top of the head. Females and juveniles are similar, but both lack the red cap of the adult male. White wing patches are prominent in flight. The dark tail has white bars on the central tail feathers.

This woodpecker's voice is a rolling churr sound. It also makes a yip yip yip sound and a kee-u, kee-u, kee-u sound. Its drum is long and steady.

Distribution & habitat 
This woodpecker's habitat consists of low desert scrub typical of the Sonoran Desert, as well as arroyos (washes) and small towns.

Behavior and ecology

Breeding 
They build nests in holes made in saguaro cacti or mesquite trees. Cavities excavated by these woodpeckers in saguaro cacti (known as a "boot") are later used by a variety of other species, including the elf owl. There, they typically lay 3–4 white eggs, although as many as 6 or 7 have been noted. 23 broods are laid a year. Both sexes incubate and feed offspring.

Feeding 
As a woodpecker, its diet is composed greatly of insects, which it gains from drilling into bark. Gila woodpeckers are omnivorous, and do take fruits, nectar, seeds, as well as lizards, eggs, worms, and even young chicks of small birds. They are even known to hang on human placed hummingbird feeders and sip up the nectar.

Status 
The IUCN rates the species as least concern. It is an endangered species in California, where populations have suffered notably. Arizona populations remain strong. The effects of climate change could severely reduce available habitat.

Gallery

References 

 Robbins, C.S., Bruun, B., Zim, H.S.; Birds of North America. New York: Western Publishing Company, Inc. (1966).

External links 

 The Nature Conservancy's Species Profile: Gila Woodpecker
 This Woodpecker Will Drill Into Your Skull And Eat Your Brains—If You’re a Baby Dove
 
 
 

Gila woodpecker
Endemic birds of Southwestern North America
Fauna of the Sonoran Desert
Native birds of the Southwestern United States
Fauna of the Lower Colorado River Valley
Fauna of the Yuma Desert
Birds of Mexico
Gila woodpecker
Gila woodpecker